The Drive for Show, Rock Fore! Dough Concert is an annual American rock benefit concert that is played at the First Tee of Augusta in Augusta, Georgia. The charitable concert was first performed in 2005.

Attendance

2005
The 2005 Rock Fore! Dough Concert was performed on May 4, 2005, and had an audience of 6,000 people. The charitable concert raised an estimated $54,000.

2006
The 2006 Rock Fore! Dough Concert was performed on January 20, 2006, and had an audience of 7,800. The concert raised an estimated $90,000.

2007
The 2007 Rock Fore! Dough Concert was performed on April 3, 2007, and had an audience of 5,000. The concert raised an estimated $20,000.

2008
The 2008 Rock Fore! Dough Concert was performed on April 9, 2008, and had an audience of 8,500. The concert raised an estimated $68,000.

Performances
Some notable performances at the Rock Fore! Dough Concert include:
Colbie Caillat
Josh Kelley
Hootie & the Blowfish
John Krueger
Collective Soul
Edwin McCain
Sister Hazel
Edison Project
Pat Blanchard Band
Dashboard Confessional
Corey Smith
John Kolbeck
Cheap Trick

References

External links
Event website
2008 Rock Fore! Dough Concert at WeSpotted

Benefit concerts in the United States
Rock festivals in the United States
Music festivals established in 2005
Culture of Augusta, Georgia
Tourist attractions in Augusta, Georgia
Music festivals in Georgia (U.S. state)